The Women's 200 metre breaststroke competition of the swimming events at the 2015 World Aquatics Championships was held on 6 August with the heats and the semifinals and 7 August with the final.

Records
Prior to the competition, the existing world and championship records were as follows.

Results

Heats
The heats were held at 10:11.

Semifinals
The semifinals were held at 17:51.

Semifinal 1

Semifinal 2

Swim-off

The swim-off was held at 19:43.

Final
The final was held at 18:25.

References

Women's 200 metre breaststroke
2015 in women's swimming